Thomas West of West Point (circa 1704–1743) was a Virginia planter who like his father Captain Thomas West represented his native King William in the House of Burgesses, but only for the year before his death (1742–1743), whereupon he was succeeded by Bernard Moore. This Thomas West also inherited the 4000 acre ancestral plantation, West Point, after the death of his cousin Charles West. This Thomas West married Elizabeth Seaton, daughter of George Seaton, and had children, including John West.

References

1743 deaths
Virginia colonial people
House of Burgesses members
People from King William County, Virginia
Thomas West (captain)